Four "ships" of the British Royal Navy have been named HMS Good Hope.

The first , of 35 guns, was captured by the French in May 1665. 
The second , of 6 guns, was a flyboat captured from the Dutch in 1665 and sold in 1667.
 The third  was a  armoured cruiser launched in 1901 and sunk in 1914 at the Battle of Coronel.
 The fourth  was a "stone ship", or land-based naval officer training base, located at Sea View, a few kilometers outside of Port Elizabeth, South Africa. It was situated in a newly built luxury hotel (The Seaview Hotel) and had a golf course, a tidal swimming pool and a tennis court. It was started in 1942 by the Royal Navy and was the only facility outside of the UK where men from all over the British Commonwealth could be trained for a commission in the RNVR. It was closed down in 1944.

There was also a South African  , which was laid down as HMS Loch Boisdale in 1944 but renamed and transferred to the South African Navy before completion.

References

Royal Navy ship names